The Vermont Catamounts men's soccer team represents the University of Vermont in all NCAA Division I men's college soccer competitions. The team competes in the America East Conference.

The team currently practices at Virtue Field adjacent to Centennial Field on campus.

Roster

Year by year results
Note: Vermont competed in the Yankee Conference from 1964 to 1979 and has competed in the America East Conference since 1988.

{| class="wikitable" style="text-align:center;"

|- align="center"

See also 
 Vermont Catamounts
 Vermont Catamounts women's soccer
 College soccer

References

External links 
 

 
Soccer clubs in Vermont
1964 establishments in Vermont
Association football clubs established in 1964